The anterior median fissure (ventral or ventromedian fissure) contains a fold of pia mater, and extends along the entire length of the medulla oblongata: It ends at the lower border of the pons in a small triangular expansion, termed the foramen cecum.

Its lower part is interrupted by bundles of fibers that cross obliquely from one side to the other, and constitute the pyramidal decussation.

Some fibers, termed the anterior external arcuate fibers, emerge from the fissure above this decussation and curve lateralward and upward over the surface of the medulla oblongata to join the inferior peduncle.

Additional images

References 

Medulla oblongata